Tea Time in the Ackerstrasse (German: Fünf-Uhr-Tee in der Ackerstraße) is a 1926 German silent drama film directed by Paul L. Stein and starring Reinhold Schünzel, Mary Nolan and Fritz Kampers.

The film's sets were designed by Otto Erdmann and Hans Sohnle.

Cast
Reinhold Schünzel 
Mary Nolan 
Maria Kamradek
Fritz Kampers 
Heinrich Schroth 
Angelo Ferrari 
Frigga Braut
Rosa Valetti

References

External links

Films of the Weimar Republic
German silent feature films
Films directed by Paul L. Stein
1926 drama films
German drama films
Films set in Berlin
German black-and-white films
Silent drama films
1920s German films
1920s German-language films